Radula marginata, or Wairuakohu, is a species of plant in the genus Radula, a genus of liverworts. It is endemic to New Zealand. It has been found to contain cannabinoids.

Cannabinoids 
Users smoking the plant have experienced different effects. The cannabinoid is not THC, the main psychoactive chemical in cannabis, but it is of similar molecular structure. The liverwort contains perrottetinene and perrottetinenic acid. The quantity of cannabinoid present is much less than in cannabis. Perrottetinene has been shown to be a moderately potent CB1 agonist leading to mild psychoactive effects in mice.

Legal status 
The liverwort grows as a common weed. Owning, growing and distributing the liverwort is legal.

Radula marginata may have been used in rongoā (Māori herbal medicine), but there is no firm evidence of this.

References 

Porellales
Flora of New Zealand